The 1996–97 CERH European League was the 32nd edition of the CERH European League organized by CERH. Its Final Four was held in Barcelona, Spain.

Format changes
As a result of the expansion of the competition, two preliminary rounds were played before the group stage, composed by eight teams divided into two groups of four each one, thus qualifying the two first qualified teams to the Final Four.

Preliminary round

|}

First round

|}

Group stage
In each group, teams played against each other home-and-away in a home-and-away round-robin format.

The two first qualified teams advanced to the Final Four.

Group A

Group B

Final four
The Final Four was played in the Palau Blaugrana in Barcelona, Spain.

Barcelona achieved their eleventh title.

Bracket

References

External links
 CERH website

1996 in roller hockey
1997 in roller hockey
Rink Hockey Euroleague